State Route 117 (SR 117) is part of Maine's system of numbered state highways, running from SR 112 in Saco to SR 219 in Turner.

Route description
SR 117 begins at SR 112 in Saco. It turns off and continues through the towns of Hollis, Limington, and Waterboro. It is shortly joined by SR 5. It runs concurrently with only SR 5 for  into Baldwin, and with SR 5 and SR 113 for  into Hiram. In Hiram, SR 117 leaves SR 113 and SR 5, and enters Denmark. SR 117 continues on into Bridgton where it eventually intersects US 302. It then continues on into the towns of Harrison and Norway. It runs concurrently with SR 118 for  until its end at the intersection of SR 26. It then runs concurrently with SR 26 for  into Paris. From there, it continues into Buckfield and then Turner, where it reaches it northern terminus at SR 219.

Junction list

References

External links

Maine State Route log via floodgap.com: Maine State Route 117

117
Transportation in York County, Maine
Transportation in Cumberland County, Maine
Transportation in Oxford County, Maine
Transportation in Androscoggin County, Maine